William J. Rupp (August 25, 1927 – February 7, 2002) was one of the modernist American architects considered part the Sarasota School of Architecture.

Early life and education
Rupp was born on August 25, 1927 in Philadelphia, Pennsylvania to Frank J. and Sarah Viola Rupp. At eighteen, Rupp was inducted into the U.S. Army as an infantryman. After an extended period of military service, during which time he moved to Florida, he remained in the military reserves until he was honorably discharged in 1955. Post active service, Rupp attended the University of Florida, graduating in 1953 with Phi Kappa Phi honors in design (architecture). In 1957, he married Gwendolyn Marie O'Rourke.

Career in Sarasota
Upon graduation, Rupp worked with founding Sarasota School of Architecture member Paul Rudolph, eventually managing Rudolph's Sarasota office. In 1955, Rudolph left Florida for New York City, and Rupp opened a private architectural practice at 224 South Orange Avenue, downtown Sarasota. During the next several years, Rupp worked closely with his architectural peers in Sarasota; Ralph Twitchell, Jack West, Gene Leedy, Tim Seibert, Victor Lundy, and Bert Brosmith. In 1959, he formed Associated Architects with friend and fellow architect Joseph Farrell. Although this partnership lasted two years, they produced several significant works, including Uhr Residence-Studio, Rupp Home, Kirsch House, Caladesi National Bank in Dunedin, the Pavilion House, and the dining pavilion at the Ringling Museum of Art.

In 1959, Clarence Scott commissioned Rupp and Farrell to design a commercial building that would serve as a showroom for the Barkus Furniture Company. Rupp and Farrell designed the building the following year. The building displays the characteristics of the Sarasota School of Architecture in planning and design, which was a prominent design in Central Florida. The building features a stucco exterior, large picture windows, and large extending concrete rafter beams.

The Scott Commercial Building was widely recognized as a ground-breaking design utilizing prefabricated concrete structural members. Acknowledging this important architectural achievement, the building was restored, renamed McCulloch Pavilion, and added to the U.S. National Register of Historic Places in 2017.

In 1962, Rupp was featured in a special edition of Life Magazine, in an article entitled, The Takeover Generation – The 100 Most Outstanding Young Men and Women in the United States.

In 1965, Rupp moved his architectural practice to Naples, Florida where he worked on several projects; including three apartment complexes, an animal clinic, a restaurant, and his own residence.

Principal projects in Sarasota 

 Davis Residence, Sarasota (with Paul Rudolph, 1953)
 Tastee Freez, Sarasota (with Paul Rudolph, 1954)
 Beach Pavilion, Manasota Key (1956)
 Wilson Residence, Sarasota (1956)
 Kisrch House, Sarasota (1957) 
 Willis Residence, Sarasota (1957)
 Hatt Residence, Sarasota (1958)
 Brentwood Elementary School (associated with Gene Leedy) (1959)
 Kiekhaefer/Mercury Marine Florida Distribution Center, Sarasota-Bradenton Airport (1959)
 Scott Building, Sarasota (with Joe Farrell, associate) (1960)
 Rupp Residence, 42nd St., Sarasota (1960)
 Doyle Residence, 42nd St., Sarasota. (1960) Renovated 2007 Seibert Architects.
 Dining Pavilion: Ringling Museum of Art, Sarasota (1961)
 Uhr Studio, Sarasota (1961)
 Bowling Green Subdivision and Model Houses, Fort Myers (1962)
 Wilcox Residence, Sarasota (1962)
 Everglades City Villas; Development and Model houses (1963)
 Fast Food Restaurant, Sarasota (1963)

Moving north
In 1968, Rupp joined Morris Ketchum Jr. & Associates in New York as an associate architect. During that time, he developed several renovations and exhibits for The Bronx Zoo and New York Aquarium.

In 1972, he moved to Amherst, Massachusetts, working with Callister, Payne & Bischoff, Architects and Community Planners. He went into private practice in the mid-1970s. Rupp became a lecturer on architecture at the University of Massachusetts, Amherst, eventually obtaining a full-time teaching appointment. By 1978, he was Director of the Architectural Studies Program and the Interior Design Program.

In 1989, Rupp co-authored and published the architectural textbook, Construction Materials for Interior Design: Principles of Structure and Properties of Materials.

He retired in 1995 and died in 2002 in Montague, Massachusetts.

Awards and citations 
 1960 Architectural Record, Award for Excellence, House Design
 1961 Progressive Architecture Design Award, for Caladesi National Bank, Dunedin, FL
 1962 Progressive Architecture Design Award, for the Uhr Studio, Sarasota FL
 1963 "Gli Giovani Architetti Americani" Italian Exhibition
 1964 American Institute of Architects (New York Chapter) for the Uhr Studio

Publications 
 1958 Willis Residence, Arts and Architecture
 1959 Willis Residence, House and Home (February)
 1959 Brentwood Elementary School, Architectural Record (February), Architectural Forum (February), Florida Architect (March)
 1960 Hatt Residence, Architectural Record (May)
 1961 Caladesi National Bank, Progressive Architecture (January), Florida Architect, (August)
 1961 Ringling Museum Pavilion, Architectural Forum (August)
 1962 Uhr Studio, Progressive Architecture (September), L'Architecture d'Aujour d'Hui (October)
 1962 Wilcox Residence, Architectural Design Preview USA,  Reinhold Publishing Co.
 1963 Project House Sarasota, American Home (June)
 1964 Bowling Green Subdivision, House and Home (September)
 1965 Uhr Studio, Casabella (September)
 1965 Everglades City Villas, Family Circle (August)
 1966 Uhr Studio, American Home (May)
 1976 Scott Building, Florida Architect (October)
 1983 Florida Architect (winter) "Sarasota School of Architects"  pp. 12–15 color
 2010 Hauser Magazine, "Florida's Gentle Modernism"  by Andres Lepik; Undine Prohl.

Bibliography

The following architectural resource books feature the work of architect William Rupp:

References

People from Sarasota, Florida
1927 births
2002 deaths
20th-century American architects
University of Florida alumni
Architects from Florida
Modernist architects from the United States